Camara DaCosta Johnson (born November 15, 1982), better known as Yaya DaCosta, is an American actress and model. She was the runner-up in Cycle 3 of America's Next Top Model. DaCosta eventually went to star in ABC's daytime drama series All My Children (2008), ABC's comedy-drama Ugly Betty (2009), and NBC's medical drama Chicago Med (2015–2022). DaCosta starred in the Lifetime television film Whitney (2015) as singer Whitney Houston and received praise for her performance.

Early life and education
DaCosta was born on November 15, 1982, in New York City and is of Brazilian and Black-American descent. She was raised in the Harlem neighborhood of New York City. In addition to English, she speaks Portuguese, French, Spanish and conversational Japanese. She attended the elite Northfield Mount Hermon School during high school before attending Brown University, where she majored in Africana studies and international relations.

Career
After finishing second on Cycle 3 of America's Next Top Model, DaCosta went on to have a successful career. DaCosta only appeared once in the bottom two during the competition. She has appeared in advertisements for Garnier Fructis, Lincoln Townhouse, Oil of Olay, Radioshack, Seda, Sephora and Dr. Scholl's. She has graced the covers of numerous magazines, including W, Hype Hair, Splash and Global Modeling. In 2014, she landed a spot in Tom Ford’s Fall/Winter advertising campaign. DaCosta began acting in 2005 after guest-starring in an episode of the UPN sitcom Eve. She then starred opposite Rob Brown, Antonio Banderas and Alfre Woodard in the 2006 dance film Take the Lead. DaCosta had supporting roles in the independent films  Honeydripper (2007) and The Messenger (2009).

She appeared in the ABC soap opera All My Children in 2008 as Cassandra Foster, the daughter of Angie Hubbard (Debbi Morgan). According to an interview with All My Children'''s new head writer, Charles Pratt, Jr., DaCosta left the role some time in August 2008, less than four months after joining the show, to join the cast of The First Breeze of Summer on Broadway. The First Breeze of Summer was presented from 2008 to 2009 by the historic Negro Ensemble Company.
In 2009, she had a recurring role as Nico Slater, the daughter of Wilhelmina Slater (Vanessa Williams) in the fourth and final season of the ABC comedy-drama series Ugly Betty.

In 2010, DaCosta had supporting roles in the comedy-drama film The Kids Are All Right and the science fiction action-adventure film Tron: Legacy. Later, she appeared in the magazines, including on the cover of W (September 2010), in L'Officiel (in November 2010), and in Vogue (in January 2011 by Patrick Demarchelier). In 2013, she also appeared as Carol in the historical drama film The Butler, starring Forest Whitaker and Oprah Winfrey.

In 2015, it was announced in an interview with actress Angela Bassett on CNN that DaCosta would star as musical icon Whitney Houston in a Lifetime television film about her life, which was Bassett's directorial debut. DaCosta received high praise for her performance.
Also from 2015 to 2021, DaCosta has starred in the NBC medical drama Chicago Med as April Sexton, an ED nurse. On May 14, 2021, DaCosta announced that she is leaving Chicago Med after six seasons and before her exit she has joined Fox's drama series Our Kind of People'' as Angela Vaughn.

Personal life
DaCosta was in a relationship with independent film producer and director Joshua Bee Alafia from 2012 to 2015. In September 2013, she gave birth to their son, Sankara. In November 2015, it was reported that DaCosta and Alafia broke up. Contrary to popular reports, DaCosta and Alafia were never officially married.

Filmography

Film/Movie

Television

Music videos

Awards and nominations

References

External links

1982 births
Living people
American people of Brazilian descent
African-American female models
American female models
African-American models
Female models from New York (state)
America's Next Top Model contestants
African-American actresses
American television actresses
American film actresses
Actresses from New York City
21st-century American actresses
People from Harlem
Northfield Mount Hermon School alumni
Brown University alumni
21st-century African-American women
21st-century African-American people
20th-century African-American people
20th-century African-American women
Brazilian American
Brazilian actors
Brazilian actresses